(also written 2015 SO2) is an Aten asteroid that is a temporary horseshoe companion to the Earth, the ninth known Earth horseshoe librator. Prior to its most recent close encounter with our planet (2015 September 30) it was an Apollo asteroid.

Discovery 

 was discovered on 21 September 2015 by B. Mikuž observing with the 0.6-m f/3.3 Cichocki telescope at the Črni Vrh Observatory in Slovenia. As of 30 November 2015, it has been observed 84 times with an observation arc of 9 days.

Orbit and orbital evolution 

 is currently an Aten asteroid (Earth-crossing but with a period less than a year). Its semi-major axis (currently 0.999115 AU) is similar to that of Earth (0.99957 AU), but it has a relatively low eccentricity (0.108105) and moderate orbital inclination (9.181°). Gravitational interaction with Earth causes its orbit to change so that its average period is one year. It alternates between being an Aten asteroid and being an Apollo asteroid, changing dynamical status every 113 years approximately. As of 30 November 2015, this object is the 14th known Earth co-orbital and the 9th known object following a horseshoe path with respect to our planet. Its orbital evolution characterized by alternating horseshoe and quasi-satellite episodes.

Physical properties 

With an absolute magnitude of 23.9, it has a diameter in the range 50–111 meters (for an assumed albedo range of 0.04–0.20, respectively).

See also 
 54509 YORP
 
 3753 Cruithne

Notes 

  This is assuming an albedo of 0.20–0.04.

References 
 

Further reading
 Understanding the Distribution of Near-Earth Asteroids Bottke, W. F., Jedicke, R., Morbidelli, A., Petit, J.-M., Gladman, B. 2000, Science, Vol. 288, Issue 5474, pp. 2190–2194.
 A Numerical Survey of Transient Co-orbitals of the Terrestrial Planets Christou, A. A. 2000, Icarus, Vol. 144, Issue 1, pp. 1–20.
 Debiased Orbital and Absolute Magnitude Distribution of the Near-Earth Objects Bottke, W. F., Morbidelli, A., Jedicke, R., Petit, J.-M., Levison, H. F., Michel, P., Metcalfe, T. S. 2002, Icarus, Vol. 156, Issue 2, pp. 399–433.
 Transient co-orbital asteroids Brasser, R., Innanen, K. A., Connors, M., Veillet, C., Wiegert, P., Mikkola, S., Chodas, P. W. 2004, Icarus, Vol. 171, Issue 1, pp. 102–109.
 From horseshoe to quasi-satellite and back again: the curious dynamics of Earth co-orbital asteroid 2015 SO2 de la Fuente Marcos, C., de la Fuente Marcos, R. 2016, Astrophysics and Space Science, Vol. 361, Issue 1, article 16 (10 pp).

External links 
 Discovery MPEC 
  data at MPC
 Crni Vrh Observatory News
 Discovery image
 The 60-cm Cichocki Sky Survey Telescope
 
 
 

Minor planet object articles (unnumbered)
Earth-crossing asteroids

20150921